The Toms River is a  freshwater river and estuary in Ocean County, New Jersey in the United States.

The Toms River rises in the Pine Barrens of northern Ocean County and flows southeast and east, fed by several branches, in a meandering course through area wetlands, emptying into Barnegat Bay, an inlet of the Atlantic Ocean.

Geography 
Much of the headwaters of the Toms River is in the New Jersey Pine Barrens. The lower  of the river is a broad tidal estuary navigable within the community of Toms River.

At , the Toms River subwatershed is the largest drainage area of any river in the Barnegat Bay watershed. It includes 11 municipalities in Ocean County, along with portions of southwestern Monmouth County.

The lowest reaches of the river provide convenient locations for marinas and yacht clubs, and points from which to go fishing and crabbing. Canoeing and kayaking are also popular on the Toms River.

The Toms River is a tidal river.

History 

Though not always named, the river has appeared on maps in the region since the New Netherland colony. Once the waterway showed up in writing, as early as 1687 and into the late 1700s, it was most often referred to as Goose Creek or Goose Neck Creek. Cartographers bounced between Goose Creek (see: Thomas Jefferys' 1776 Map and Arrowsmith's 1804 Map) or Toms Creek (see: Mathew Carey's 1795 Map). One pair of cartographers, Henry Charles Carey and Isaac Lea, let the person reading the map decide which to call it, opting for "Goose or Toms Cr." (see: Carey's 1814 State Map of New Jersey).

Carey and Lea would publish another map in 1822 that dropped Goose Creek's name from the river entirely. Subsequent maps would follow suit with the name Toms River.

Etymology 
The exact origin of the name Toms River has been lost to history, but there are a number of theories. Two of the three most often referenced are written in historical author Edwin Salter's book A History of Monmouth and Ocean Counties: Embracing a Genealogical Record of Earliest Settlers in Monmouth and Ocean Counties and Their Descendants from 1890. In it, Salter lays out the following sources for the river's namesake:

 Captain William Tom, an English civil officer for West Jersey from 1664 to 1674, who, during an exploratory expedition, visited the stream and the surrounding region. The name of the river was given in his honor "because he first brought it to the notice of the whites" and persuaded them to settle there. Salter, the author of this explanation, admits that the evidence to support it is inconclusive, but still favors this one above all others, as he had previously detailed the captain's exploits in his 1874 book Old Times in Old Monmouth. Historical Reminiscences of Old Monmouth County New Jersey
 A noted Native American, called either "Indian Tom" or "Thomas Pumha", who lived on the north bank, in what is present-day Island Heights, who assisted during the American Revolutionary War. Salter is not convinced of this theory, however, as he writes:

 Local farmer and ferryman Thomas Luker, who came to the area in the late 1600s. Luker married the daughter of a local Lenape chief in 1695. Together they established a homestead on the north bend, where the river begins to open, near the site of the downtown Toms River Post Office (Water Street & Irons Street).

In 1992, for the town's 225th anniversary, Thomas Luker was officially recognized as the "Tom" in question by the township government and local historians.

Superfund sites

Ciba-Geigy

Background 
Beginning in the first half of the 1900s, the Ciba-Geigy Chemical Corporation established a site in Dover Township (now Toms River Township) where it manufactured pigments and dyes. The manufacturing process created a large amount of sludge and toxic waste, which was initially disposed of in unlined pits located on-site. In the 1960s, the company built a ten-mile long pipeline to disposing of nearly two billion gallons of wastewater into the Atlantic Ocean.

That same year, the United States Environmental Protection Agency completed a preliminary assessment under the Potential Hazardous Waste Site Program. In 1983, the EPA placed the site on the Superfund National Priorities List.

Site clean-up 
The EPA has been progressing through a multi-phase cleanup of the site since the early 1980s. Cleanup of the on-site source areas began in October 2003, with off-site processing and treatment finishing in 2010.

According to the departments website, the following milestones have been met so far:

The site was ordered to undergo five reviews to be performed every five years by the EPA. The first sitewide review was performed in September 2003. The final review is estimated to be completed in July 2023.

Reich Farm 
In August 1971, the Reich family leased a large portion of their 3-acre farm off Route 9 to independent waste hauler, Nicholas Fernicola.

In December of that same year, the Reichs discovered nearly 4,500 waste-filled drums from Union Carbide's Bound Brook plant. The family was able to identify the source of the waste by the labels left on many of the drums; the labels also indicated the contents, which included "blend of resin and oil", "tar pitch", and "lab waste solvent". Evidence of the waste being dumped was also found on the property, in the form of trenches that hadn't existed before the land was rented, as were examples of the full drums leaching their contents into the soil and nearby water table.

The Reichs sued Fernicola and Union Carbide, and, in 1972, the court ordered an end to the dumping and the removal of all drums and contaminated soil. Despite clean-up efforts, in early 1974, residents commented on an unusual smell and taste of their well water. Upon inspection, the NJEPA found the groundwater was heavily contaminated with organic compounds, such as phenol and toluene.

The Reich Farm site was officially included on the EPA's National Priorities List (NPL) in September 1983, and, after over two decades of remediation and testing, was removed from the Superfund list in June 2021. The site was ordered to undergo five reviews to be performed every five years by the EPA. The first sitewide review was performed in September 2003. The final review is estimated to be completed between September–November 2023.

Cancer cluster 
Both the Ciba-Geigy and Reich Farms sites resulted in the contamination of an overlapping area groundwater, during an coinciding period of time. In September 1997, the New Jersey Department of Health (NJDOH), at the request of the Agency for Toxic Substances and Disease Registry, evaluated childhood cancer incidences in Toms River. The NJDOH reviewed data from the State Cancer Registry (SCR) from 1979 to 1991. According to the Summary Report released by the NJDOH, "The results of the 1995 NJDHSS cancer evaluation indicated that Ocean County as a whole and the Toms River section of Dover ... had an excess of childhood brain and central nervous system (CNS) cancer relative to the entire State." The NJDOH reviewed the entire county, but found Toms River (then known as Dover Township) was "the only statistically significantly elevated town in the county."

As a result of the findings, the NJDOH ordered a case-control study of the area to exam and identify risks factors. The results of this study were made available in January 2003, with the primary hypothesis being the cancer rates were related to the "environmental exposure pathways" reported over the previous 30 years. The study reported: "No consistent patterns of association were seen between the environmental factors of primary interest and any of the cancer groupings during the postnatal exposure period" and "No consistent patterns of association were seen between the other environmental factors and any of the cancer groupings evaluated." The report acknowledged the findings could be easily skewed, due to the small sample size, and recommended the continuation of clean-up efforts at the Reich Farm and Ciba-Geigy sites. It was also recommended that an additional five-year incidence evaluation be made once the data from 1996 to 2000 was available from the SCR.

A 2014, Pulitzer Prize-winning book, Toms River: A Story of Science and Salvation, examined the issue of cancer clusters in detail. Recent public-private coalitions to restore the river and to preserve the wetland areas near its source in the Pinelands, as well as the EPA stage assessments have resulted in an increase in water quality.

Flood events 
Because the Toms River is a tidal river, with direct feed into Barnegat Bay, it is prone to flooding. The United States Geological Survey (USGS) tracks and reports on significant flood events, along with the National Oceanic and Atmospheric Administration (NOAA) tracking daily tide levels.

2010 Nor'easter 
From March 12–15, 2010, a Nor'easter hit the New Jersey coastline.

Hurricane Irene 
Irene became the first hurricane to make landfall in New Jersey since 1903. The storm surge that followed, combined with the rainfall from the hurricane and the wet conditions in the weeks prior, led to record USGS gage readings for over 40% of all stations with at least 20 years of data.

The river also saw significant flow rates and gage heights in November 2018, October 2005, and May 1984.

Tributaries
 Davenport Branch
 Ridgeway Branch
 Union Branch
 Wrangle Brook

See also
 List of New Jersey rivers
 List of cancer clusters
 Toms Canyon impact crater

References

External links
 U.S. Geological Survey: NJ stream gaging stations
 Toms River Township web site
Toms River Online
TomsRiver.org - Community News, Business Directory and Events Portal
The Toms River Times

Rivers of Ocean County, New Jersey
Rivers in the Pine Barrens (New Jersey)
Rivers of New Jersey
Tributaries of Barnegat Bay
Watersheds of the United States
American Revolutionary War sites
Superfund sites